The 2022 Zagreb Open was a professional tennis tournament played on clay courts. It was part of the 2022 ATP Challenger Tour. It took place in Zagreb, Croatia between 9 and 14 May 2022.

Singles main-draw entrants

Seeds

 Rankings are as of 2 May 2022.

Other entrants
The following players received wildcards into the singles main draw:
  Kalin Ivanovski
  Mili Poljičak
  Dino Prižmić

The following players received entry into the singles main draw as alternates:
  Duje Ajduković
  Attila Balázs
  Riccardo Bonadio

The following players received entry from the qualifying draw:
  Nerman Fatić
  Carlos Gimeno Valero
  Fábián Marozsán
  Filip Misolic
  Maximilian Neuchrist
  Wu Yibing

The following players received entry as lucky losers:
  Tristan Lamasine
  Shang Juncheng
  Zhang Zhizhen

Champions

Singles

 Filip Misolic def.  Mili Poljičak 6–3, 7–6(8–6).

Doubles

 Adam Pavlásek /  Igor Zelenay def.  Domagoj Bilješko /  Andrey Chepelev 4–6, 6–3, [10–2].

References

2022 ATP Challenger Tour
May 2022 sports events in Croatia
Zagreb Open
2022 in Croatian sport